Security BSides (commonly referred to as BSides) is a series of loosely affiliated information security conferences. It was co-founded by Mike Dahn, Jack Daniel, and Chris Nickerson in 2009. Due to an overwhelming number of presentation submissions to Black Hat USA in 2009, the rejected presentations were presented to a smaller group of individuals. Over time the conference format matured and was released to enable individuals to start their own BSides conferences. The Las Vegas BSides conference is also considered part of Hacker Summer Camp given it's schedule and proximity to other security conferences during that time.

There are three event styles, Structured, Unconference, and hybrid. A Structured event follows the traditional conference model and often happens in tandem with other larger conferences such as Black Hat, RSA, etc. Attendees typically intermingle and attend one or more events. Talks are submitted to the local event ahead of time, selected, and scheduled prior to the start of the conference. In the Unconference, or anti-conference, event style it's completely attendee driven. Attendees appear at a predetermined time, discuss ideas, and collaboratively agree upon what the schedule will look like for that day. Talks that get the most attention and conversation get added to the schedule.

See also 
 Hacker conference
 Black Hat
 DEF CON
 Kiwicon
 Summercon

References

External links 
 Official Website
 Unconference

Computer security conferences
Hacker conventions
Unconferences